Russel E. Caflisch (born 29 April 1954) is an American mathematician.

Biography
Caflisch is Director of the Courant Institute of Mathematical Sciences at New York University (NYU), and a Professor in the Mathematics Department. Russel Edward Caflisch was born in Charleston, West Virginia. He received his bachelor's degree from Michigan State University in 1975. He earned a master's degree and Ph.D. in Mathematics from the Courant Institute of Mathematical Sciences at New York University. His dissertation was titled "The Fluid Dynamic Limit and Shocks for a Model Boltzmann Equation." (1978) He has also held faculty positions at Stanford and NYU. He has served as PhD advisor for 22 students, with 55 descendants. Up until August 2017, Caflisch was the director of the Institute for Pure & Applied Mathematics (IPAM) and a professor in the Mathematics department, where he also held a joint appointment in the department of Materials Science and Engineering.

Caflisch was a founding member of California NanoSystems Institute (CNSI).  Caflisch's expertise includes topics in the field of applied mathematics, including partial differential equations, fluid dynamics, plasma physics, materials science, Monte Carlo methods, and computational finance.

Recognition
Caflisch was awarded the Hertz Foundation Graduate Fellowship in 1975 and a Sloan Foundation Research Fellowship in 1984. He was named a fellow of the Society for Industrial and Applied Mathematics in 2009, the American Mathematical Society in 2012, and the American Academy of Arts and Sciences in 2013.
He was elected a member of the National Academy of Sciences in April 2019.

Caflisch was an invited speaker at International Congress of Mathematicians in Madrid in 2006, and at the conference Dynamics, Equations and Applications in Kraków in 2019.

Personal life
His parents are Edward G. Caflisch and Dorothy G. Caflisch.

Russel Caflisch is married to Carol Lynn Meylan.

Books
Mathematical Aspects of Vortex Dynamics (Society for Industrial and Applied Mathematic, 1989)

References

External links
Personal Webpage

1954 births
Living people
20th-century American mathematicians
21st-century American mathematicians
University of California, Los Angeles faculty
New York University alumni
Fellows of the Society for Industrial and Applied Mathematics
Fellows of the American Academy of Arts and Sciences
Fellows of the American Mathematical Society
Members of the United States National Academy of Sciences